The St. Catharines Spartans are a Junior "B" box lacrosse team from St. Catharines, Ontario, Canada.  The Spartans play in the OLA Junior B Lacrosse League.

History

The Spartans franchise won the Founders Cup as Canada's Junior B box lacrosse champions in 1981 and 1996. In 2002, the Spartans were league champions again, but lost the national final to the Clarington Green Gaels.

Founded in 1979, as the Niagara-on-the-Lake Warriors, the Warriors won their league and the national championship in only their third season.  In 1984, the team changed its name to the Niagara Spartan Warriors.

In 1994, the team shortened its name to just the "Spartan Warriors" and in 1996 won the league and national championships again.  In the 1996 national final, the Spartan Warriors defeated the Orillia Rama Kings to win it all.  After the 2001 season, the team changed its name to the St. Catharines Spartans.

Season-by-season results
Note: GP = Games played, W = Wins, L = Losses, T = Ties, Pts = Points, GF = Goals for, GA = Goals against

External links
Spartan Webpage
The Bible of Lacrosse
Unofficial OLA Page

Ontario Lacrosse Association teams
Sport in St. Catharines